Rafiganj Assembly constituency is an assembly constituency for Bihar Legislative Assembly in Aurangabad, Bihar district of Bihar, India. It comes under Aurangabad Lok Sabha constituency along with other assembly constituencies viz. Kutumba, Aurangabad, Gurua, Imamganj and Tikari.

Members of Legislative Assembly

Election results

Assembly Elections 2020

See also 
 List of constituencies of Bihar Legislative Assembly

References

External links
 

Assembly constituencies of Bihar